The Gypsy Caravan Tour was a worldwide concert tour by Australian hard rock band Wolfmother. Staged in promotion of their 2016 fourth studio album Victorious and named after a song on the album, it is visiting clubs and theatres throughout 2016. The tour began with a North American leg starting in Minneapolis on 24 February, which will be followed by a run of shows in Europe from 8 April. In the summer, the band will perform at a number of festivals in the United States, including Rock on the Range in Columbus, Ohio.

Background
The opening North American leg of the Gypsy Caravan Tour was first announced in November 2015 along with the announcement of the album Victorious. At the time of the announcement, the band's frontman Andrew Stockdale noted that the drummer on the tour would be dependent on the schedules of various people, with Cosmic Egg drummer Dave Atkins a possibility. It was later revealed that Alex Carapetis, who played with the band at a number of shows in 2015, would be returning to the group to play drums on the tour.

For the opening North American leg, Wolfmother were supported by Los Angeles-based alternative rock duo Deap Vally. For the European leg starting 8 April 2016, Cincinnati hard rock group Electric Citizen were the opening act.

Set list
The following is the set list from the band's performance on 24 February 2016, which is representative of completed dates on the tour.

"Victorious"
"New Moon Rising"
"Woman"
"Apple Tree"
"The Love That You Give"
"White Unicorn"
"California Queen"
"How Many Times"

"Gypsy Caravan"
"Dimension"
"The Simple Life"
"Mind's Eye"
"Colossal"
Encore
"Vagabond"
"Joker & the Thief"

On 5 March 2016, the band played a different set list for the first time on the tour.

"Dimension"
"Victorious"
"New Moon Rising"
"Woman"
"Apple Tree"
"The Love That You Give"
"White Unicorn"
"I Ain't Got No"
"California Queen"

"How Many Times"
"Gypsy Caravan"
"The Simple Life"
"Mind's Eye"
"Pyramid"
"Colossal"
Encore
"Vagabond"
"Joker & the Thief"

Tour dates

Notes

Personnel
Andrew Stockdale – lead vocals, guitar
Ian Peres – bass, keyboards, backing vocals
Alex Carapetis – drums

References

Wolfmother
2016 concert tours
Concert tours of the United States
Concert tours of Canada
Concert tours of Ireland
Concert tours of the United Kingdom
Concert tours of Germany
Concert tours of France